Sphenarches nanellus is a species of moth in the genus Sphenarches known from Brazil and Peru. The host plant for the species is Eupatorium betonicaeforme.

References

Platyptiliini
Moths described in 1864
Moths of South America
Taxa named by Francis Walker (entomologist)